Przebój Wolbrom is a Polish football club based in Wolbrom. They currently play in liga okręgowa (Kraków I Lesser Poland group).

Achievements 
 10th place in the 2008–09 II liga season.
 Promotion to III liga in the 2006–07 season.
 Lesser Poland's Polish Cup winner in the 2007–08 season (as Przebój Wolbrom II).

Notable people 
 Antoni Szymanowski - former coach of Przebój Wolbrom (2005–2008) - the former Poland national football team player

References

External links
  
 Przebój Wolbrom at the 90minut.pl website 

 
Football clubs in Poland
Association football clubs established in 1937
Olkusz County
Football clubs in Lesser Poland Voivodeship
1937 establishments in Poland